Dora Kotzee, sometimes misspelled Dorah Coetzee, is a South African politician who represented the African National Congress (ANC) in the Free State Provincial Legislature from 2014 to 2019. During that time, she served as the Free State's Member of the Executive Council (MEC) for Public Works and Infrastructure from 2015 to 2018, and from 2018 to 2019 she occupied an expanded portfolio as MEC for Public Works, Infrastructure and Human Settlements.

Political career 
Until 2014, Kotzee represented the ANC as a councillor in Lejweleputswa District Municipality and Matjhabeng Local Municipality. In the 2014 general election, she was narrowly elected to an ANC seat in the Free State Provincial Legislature, ranked 22nd on the ANC's provincial party list. She served as Deputy Majority Chief Whip in the legislature until May 2015, when Premier Ace Magashule announced that she would join the Free State Executive Council in a reshuffle. She succeeded Sam Mashinini as MEC for Public Works and Infrastructure.  

Kotzee continued in that portfolio throughout the rest of Magashule's premiership and into the term of Magashule's successor, Premier Sisi Ntombela. In Ntombela's first reshuffle, announced in May 2018, Kotzee retained the Public Works and Infrastructure portfolio and was additionally allocated responsibility for the Human Settlements portfolio, making her MEC for Public Works, Infrastructure and Human Settlements. 

The following year, Kotzee left the legislature and the Executive Council after the 2019 general election; ranked 25th on the ANC's party list, she did not secure re-election to her seat. As of 2022, she had returned to Lejweleputswa District Municipality, where she served as a councillor and Member of the Mayoral Committee.

References

External links 

 

Members of the Free State Provincial Legislature
African National Congress politicians
21st-century South African politicians
Living people
Year of birth missing (living people)
21st-century South African women politicians